The ETAP 21i is a Belgian trailerable sailboat that was designed by Mortain & Mavrikios as a cruiser and first built in 1997.

The ETAP 21i design was developed into the ETAP 22s after 2009, a design using the same hull, but it was not known if any had been produced by 2021.

Production
The ETAP 21i was built by ETAP Yachting in Belgium between 1997 and 2009, with 549 boats completed, but it is now out of production.

Design
The design is a recreational keelboat, built predominantly of glassfibre, with wood trim. It has a fractional sloop rig; a plumb stem; a vertical transom; twin transom-hung rudders controlled by a tiller and two fixed, shallow draft, tandem keels.

The boat is normally fitted with a small outboard motor for docking and maneuvering.

Variants
ETAP 21i
This model was and produced from 1997 to 2009.
ETAP 22s
This model was introduced after 2009 and uses the same hull as the 21i.

Operational history
The boat was at one time supported by a class club, the ETAP Owners Association.

In a 2003 review in Yacht and Boat magazine, Barry Tranter wrote, "as the wind builds she heels initially, then the cast-iron bulb keel stiffens her up. And just when you think you may need to reach for the traveller to ease a bit of pressure you realise that the leeward rudder is biting deep into the water and keeps the boat tracking straight. This is the most memorable aspect of the Etap's behaviour; because the rudders are inclined to the vertical at rest (i.e. their lower tips are canted outwards) the leeward rudder is more or less vertical as the boat heels and it is also pushed deeper into the water as the leeward bilge submerges (and the windward rudder lifts clear.) As a result directional stability is exceptional, vital on short, light hulls, which can get out of sorts when tiller, mainsheet and the skipper's brain get out of phase with sharp gusts and lulls. Handling the Etap is simple ... This is a delightful and refreshing boat to sail..."

See also
List of sailing boat types

References

External links
Video tour of an ETAP 21i

Keelboats
1990s sailboat type designs
Sailing yachts
Trailer sailers
Sailboat type designs by Mortain & Mavrikios
Sailboat types built by ETAP Yachting